La resurrezione (The Resurrection), HWV 47, is an oratorio by George Frideric Handel, set to a libretto by Carlo Sigismondo Capece (1652–1728). Capece was court poet to Queen Marie Casimire of Poland, who was living in exile in Rome. It was first performed on Easter Sunday, 8 April 1708 at Rome, with the backing of the Marchese Francesco Ruspoli, Handel's patron at this time. The work details the events between — and during — Good Friday and Easter Sunday, with the action carried forward in recitative, and exploration of character and delineation of mood taking place in the arias. The characters of the liturgical drama that appear in the oratorio are Lucifer (bass), Mary Magdalene (soprano), an angel (soprano), John the Evangelist (tenor), and Mary Cleophas (alto).

First performance
A large orchestra was employed for the occasion, consisting of 39 strings of varying types, 1 viola da gamba, 2 trumpets, 1 trombone, and 4 oboes. The staging and scenery were also lavishly produced, and though Roman censorship of the time forbade opera, La resurrezione was certainly produced in an operatic manner. It was produced at Ruspoli's Palazzo in the main hall on the ground floor. A series of terraced seats, 4 in number, was built for the orchestra, curved towards the audience and rising at the back. Twenty-eight specially commissioned music stands were built for the occasion, engraved with either the coat-of-arms of Ruspoli or his wife. The proscenium was decorated with a tapestry depicting cherubs, palm trees, and foliage: in the middle of which hung a plaque with the name of the oratorio. The 46 letters were spread out over 4 lines, each letter about 18 cm in height. These letters were brought into prominence by the backing light of seventy light pans. The canvas backdrop represented pictorially the characters of Handel's oratorio, and in the centre was depicted the resurrection itself.

The role of Mary Magdalene was sung at the first performance by the soprano Margherita Durastanti. The participation of female singers was prohibited by Papal edict, and the Pope went to the length of admonishing Ruspoli for permitting Durastanti to take part. For the remaining performances, her role was sung by a castrato. The only details given concerning this individual are that he was called "Pippo", and that he was in service to the former Queen Casimire. Durastanti later sang the title role in Handel's Agrippina. The aria "Ho un non so che", which she had sung as Mary Magdalene anticipating the resurrection, appears entirely unadapted for her to sing in Agrippina, though in a different context. The violins at the first performance of La resurrezione were led by the famous violinist Arcangelo Corelli (who also conducted the work). It was most likely Ernst Christian Hesse who played the demanding viola da gamba solo part.

Other catalogues of Handel's music have referred to the work as HG xxxix; and HHA i/3.

Roles

Structure

Notes

References
Hogwood, Christopher. Handel (1988), Thames and Hudson, .

Bibliography
R. Ewerhart : New Sources for Handel’s La Resurrezione, ML, xli (1960), 127–35
E. Rosand : Handel Paints the Resurrection, Festa musicologica: Essays in Honor of George J. Buelow, ed. T.J. Mathiesen and B.V. Rivera (Stuyvesant, NY, 1995), 7–52
A. Hicks : Handel’s Early Musical Development, PRMA, ciii (1976–7), 80–89
D. Burrows, ed.:  The Cambridge Companion to Handel (Cambridge, 1997)

External links
 Score of La Resurrezione (ed. Friedrich Chrysander, Leipzig 1878)

Oratorios by George Frideric Handel
1708 compositions
Oratorios based on the Bible